Curtis Hertel (March 7, 1953 – March 27, 2016) was the co-speaker of the Michigan House of Representatives from 1993-1994, during the time when the house was split evenly between Republicans and Democrats.  He was a Democrat.  He shared the speakership with Republican Paul Hillegonds.

Hertel held a bachelor's degree from Wayne State University.

Hertel was first elected to the State House of Representatives in 1980.  His predecessor as speaker of the Michigan House, Lew Dodak, was voted out of office in the 1992 election.

In all Hertel served in the Michigan House of Representatives from 1980 until 1998.

Curtis Hertel's son, Curtis Hertel Jr., was elected to the Michigan State Senate in 2014. His youngest son, Kevin Hertel was elected to the Michigan House of Representatives in 2016. Hertel died on March 27, 2016.

References

Additional sources
Daniel Loepp. Sharing the Balance of Power: An Examinnation of Shared Power in the Michigan House of Representatives, 1993-94. Ann Arbor: University of Michigan Press, 1999.
Project Vote Smart bio of Hertel

1953 births
2016 deaths
Speakers of the Michigan House of Representatives
Democratic Party members of the Michigan House of Representatives
Wayne State University alumni
Politicians from Detroit
20th-century American politicians